Perinone is a class of organic compounds.  The parent compound has two isomers, each of which are useful pigments.

It is prepared from naphthalenetetracarboxylic dianhydride by condensation with o-phenylenediamine. The two Isomers of perinone are useful pigments.  The trans isomer is called Pigment Orange 43 ("PO43") and the cis isomer is called Pigment Red 194 ("PR194").   Like some structurally related compounds perinone is also an organic semiconductor.

References 

Naphthalenes
Pigments
Organic pigments
Shades of orange
Shades of red